Moses Kizige, is a Ugandan politician, currently State Minister for Karamoja in the Ugandan Cabinet. He was appointed to that position on 6 June 2016, replacing Barbara Nekesa Oundo, who was dropped from cabinet. Kizige also serves as the elected member of parliament, representing Bugabula North Constituency, in Kamuli District, in the 10th Parliament of Uganda (2016–2021).

Background
He was born in Kamuli District, Busoga sub-region, in the Eastern Region of Uganda.

Career
He is an active community leader in his home district. He represented his current parliamentary constituency between 1996 until 2006 but lost during the 2006 general election. Between 2006 and 2016 he served as Senior Presidential Advisor on Foreign Affairs. On 6 June 2016, he was appointed State Minister for Karamoja.

See also
 Cabinet of Uganda
 Parliament of Uganda

References

External links
 Website of Parliament of Uganda
 Kamuli in crisis as district speaker strikes over pay

Living people
Kamuli District
National Resistance Movement politicians
Members of the Parliament of Uganda
Government ministers of Uganda
People from Eastern Region, Uganda
Year of birth missing (living people)
21st-century Ugandan politicians